Wimmer's shrew (Crocidura wimmeri) is a white-toothed shrew found only in Côte d'Ivoire. It is listed as a critically endangered species due to habitat loss and a restricted range.

Shrew species assignment is a challenge due to their strong phenotypic similarities, which is why the C. wimmeri had been considered to be extinct since 1976, until a rediscovery in 2013. More specifically, a study was conducted that investigated the diversity and distribution of small mammals in Banco National Park which used Sherman and Longworth traps(which are standard traps used to catch live animals) in order to determine the species richness and diversity of rodents and shrews in the primary forest, secondary forest and swamps(Kadjo). The study captured four specimens of the critically endangered Wimmer’s shrew.

References

Endemic fauna of Ivory Coast
Crocidura
Mammals described in 1958
Taxa named by Henri Heim de Balsac